The Battle of Skopje occurred in the vicinity of the city of Skopje in 1004.

Background
In 1003, Basil II launched a campaign against the First Bulgarian Empire and after eight months of siege conquered the important town of Vidin to the north-west. The Bulgarian counter strike in the opposite direction towards Odrin did not distract him from his aim and after seizing Vidin he marched southwards through the valley of the Morava destroying the Bulgarian castles on his way. Eventually, Basil II reached the vicinity of Skopje and learned that the camp of the Bulgarian army was situated very close on the other side of the Vardar river.

Battle
Samuil of Bulgaria relied on the high waters of the river of Vardar and did not take any serious precautions to secure the camp. Strangely the circumstances were the same as at the battle of Spercheios seven years earlier, and the scenario of the fight was similar. The Byzantines managed to find a fjord, crossed the river and attacked the heedless Bulgarians at night. Unable to resist effectively the Bulgarians soon retreated, leaving the camp and Samuil's tent in the hands of the Byzantines.
During this battle Samuil managed to escape and headed east.

References
 Йордан Андреев, Милчо Лалков, Българските ханове и царе, Велико Търново, 1996.

11th century in Bulgaria
1000s in the Byzantine Empire
Battles involving the First Bulgarian Empire
Battles of the Byzantine–Bulgarian Wars in Macedonia
Military history of North Macedonia
History of Skopje
Medieval Macedonia
Conflicts in 1004
Battles of Basil II
1004 in Europe
Night battles